Flying squirrel is a tribe of 44 species of squirrel

Flying squirrel may also refer to:
Forsythia (flying squirrel), a fossil flying squirrel
Gliding possum, marsupials from Australia and New Guinea
 Rocky the Flying Squirrel, a title character from The Rocky and Bullwinkle Show
The Richmond Flying Squirrels, the post-2009 name for the minor league baseball team previously known as the West Haven Yankees, formed in 1972
The name of a takedown technique made famous by American Olympic Greco-Roman wrestler Ellis Coleman, who also shares the nickname
A nickname for American Olympic gymnast Gabby Douglas
A nickname of American professional baseball player Jeff McNeil
The Scott Flying Squirrel motorcycle

See also
Flying squirrel typhus

Animal common name disambiguation pages